The Tejano Music Award for Single of the Year was an honor presented annually at the Tejano Music Awards from 1981 to 1995. The category was retired, while eligible entries were nominated for the Tejano Music Award for Song of the Year and the genre-specific categories Tejano Crossover, Mexican Regional Song, and Tejano Country Song of the Year. The only English-language recording to have won the award (and to be nominated) was "Oh Girl" by La Mafia in 1983, which was included on Honey, which also won Album of the Year. The most awarded artist is Mazz, who holds four wins, while Luis Silva remains the most awarded songwriter.

Recipients

See also 

Music of Texas

References

General

Specific

External links
Official site of the Tejano Music Awards

Single of the Year
Awards established in 1981
Awards disestablished in 1996